
The 2015 Sunderland City Council election took place on 7 May 2015 to elect members of Sunderland City Council in England. This was on the same day as other local elections, and the 2015 General Election.

Background 
There had been one by-election held in the period since the previous local elections in 2014 which saw Labour hold the Washington East ward in November 2014 following the resignation of their incumbent councillor in October.

Election results
The election saw Labour gain three seats, increasing the party's majority on the Council. Labour gained from the Conservatives in Barnes and Fulwell, and from an Independent, Colin Wakefield, in Houghton.

After the election, the composition of the council was:

Ward by ward results
Asterisk denotes incumbent councillor.

Barnes Ward

Castle Ward

Copt Hill Ward

Doxford Ward

Fulwell Ward

Hendon Ward

Hetton Ward

Houghton Ward

Millfield Ward

Pallion Ward

Redhill Ward

Ryhope Ward

St Anne's Ward

St Chad's Ward

St Michael's Ward

St Peter's Ward

Sandhill Ward

Shiney Row Ward

Silksworth Ward

Southwick Ward

Washington Central Ward

Washington East Ward

Washington North Ward

Washington South Ward

Washington West Ward

References

List of candidates standing - Local Government Election, Sunderland City Council

2015 English local elections
May 2015 events in the United Kingdom
2015
21st century in Tyne and Wear